Atherix lantha is a species of watersnipe fly in the family Athericidae.

Distribution
Canada, United States.

References

Athericidae
Insects described in 1977
Diptera of North America